Sean Giambrone (born May 30, 1999) is an American actor. His on-screen roles include Adam F. Goldberg in the sitcom The Goldbergs and Ron Stoppable in the Disney Channel film Kim Possible. His voice acting credits include Yumyulack Solar-Opposites in Solar Opposites, Jeff Randell in Clarence, Russell in Russell Madness, and Jimmy McGill in Slippin' Jimmy.

Early life
Giambrone was born in St. Joseph, Michigan to a family of Italian and German descent, and raised in Park Ridge, Illinois, where he attended Lincoln Middle School and Maine South High School. , he is based in Los Angeles, but often visits Park Ridge.

Career
He took up acting at the age of nine, starring in television commercials for McDonald's and Friendly's Restaurants, among others. His first film role was as Afro Boy in I Heart Shakey.

From 2013-2023, Giambrone played the part of Adam Goldberg, the youngest child of Wendi McLendon-Covey and Jeff Garlin's characters, Beverly and Murray, in the ABC comedy series The Goldbergs.

In February 2014, Giambrone joined the voice cast of the animated series Clarence, which aired on Cartoon Network, providing the voice of Jeff Randell, the title character's best friend. He also made an appearance in R.L. Stine's The Haunting Hour, and provided the voice of a bull terrier named Russell in the DVD film Russell Madness. He also was on the soundtrack for Kim Possible.

From 2020 to 2022, he voiced Ben Pincus in Jurassic World: Camp Cretaceous.

Filmography

Film

Television

Video Games

References

External links 
 

1999 births
Living people
American male child actors
American male film actors
American people of German descent
American people of Italian descent
American male television actors
American male voice actors
Male actors from Michigan
21st-century American male actors